

British Empire
Antigua – Benjamin d'Urban, Governor of Antigua (1819–1826)
India – Francis Rawdon-Hastings, 1st Marquess of Hastings, Governor-General of India (1813–1823)
Ionian Islands – Thomas Maitland, Lord High Commissioner (1816–1823)
 Malta Colony – Thomas Maitland, Governor of Malta (1813–1824)
New South Wales
 Major-General Lachlan Macquarie, Governor of New South Wales (1810–1821)
 Major-General Thomas Brisbane, Governor of New South Wales (1821–1825)

Portugal
Angola –
 Manuel Vieira Tovar de Albuquerque, Governor of Angola (1819–1821)
 Joaquim Inácio de Lima, Governor of Angola (1821–1822)

Spanish Empire
Viceroyalty of New Granada – Juan de la Cruz Mourgeón y Achet, nominal Viceroy of New Granada (1819–1821)
Viceroyalty of New Spain –
Juan Ruíz de Apodaca, conde de Venadito, Viceroy of New Spain (1816–1821)
Francisco Novella Azabal Pérez y Sicardo, Viceroy of New Spain (1821)
Juan O'Donojú, Viceroy of New Spain (1821)
Captaincy General of Cuba –
Juan Manuel Cajigal y Niño, Governor of Cuba (1819–1821)
Nicolás de Mahy y Romo, Governor of Cuba (1821–1822)
Spanish East Indies – Mariano Fernández de Folgueras, Governor-General of the Philippines (1816–1822)
Captaincy General of Santo Domingo – José Núñez de Cáceres, Governor of Santo Domingo (1821)
Viceroyalty of Peru –
Joaquín de la Pezuela y Sánchez, marqués de Viluma, Viceroy of Peru (1816–1821)
José de la Serna e Hinojosa, 1st Count of los Andes, Viceroy of Peru (1821–1824)

Colonial governors
Colonial governors
1821